Wood Street is a street in the City of London, the historic centre and primary financial district of London. It originates in the south at a junction with Cheapside; heading north it crosses Gresham Street and London Wall. The northernmost end runs alongside The Postern, part of the Barbican estate, stopping at Andrewes House. Today Wood Street lies within the wards of Bassishaw (north of Gresham Street) and Cheap (south of Gresham Street).

The street was originally the main north–south route through the Roman Fort, which was discovered after World War II bombing. The north gate of the fort became Cripplegate, the south gate of the fort was just south of the junction with Love Lane, and the road diverts slightly to the east suggesting that the gate was blocked up or in use, and they had to knock through the Roman fort wall to allow Wood Street to continue.

It has been suggested that this was an early road after the so-called Alfredian restoration of the City in around 886 AD. The road led from the main port at Queenhithe (Bread Street) to the main market street at Cheapside and then on north to Cripplegate and out of London to the north.

Wood Street was formerly the location of the headquarters of the City of London Police, at its corner with Love Lane, before leaving the site in 2020. There is a tower on a traffic island in the middle of the street, which is all that remains of the church of St Alban, Wood Street. Other notable buildings include 88 Wood Street, and the hall of the Worshipful Company of Pewterers on nearby Oat Lane.

See also
Aldermanbury
Basinghall Street
Wood Street Counter

References

External links 

Streets in the City of London